Manfred Joshua Sakel (June 6, 1900 – December 2, 1957) was an Austrian-Jewish (later Austrian-American) neurophysiologist and psychiatrist, credited with developing insulin shock therapy in 1927.

Biography
Sakel was born on June 6, 1900, in Nadvirna (Nadwórna), in the former Austria-Hungary Empire (now Ukraine), which was part of Poland between the world wars. Sakel studied Medicine at the University of Vienna from 1919 to 1925, specializing in neurology and neuropsychiatry. From 1927 until 1933 Sakel worked in hospitals in Berlin. In 1933 he became a researcher at the University of Vienna's Neuropsychiatric Clinic. In 1936, after receiving an invitation from Frederick Parsons, the state commissioner of mental hygiene, he chose to emigrate from Austria to the United States of America. In the USA, he became an attending physician and researcher at the Harlem Valley State Hospital.

Dr. Sakel was the developer of insulin shock therapy from 1927 while a young doctor in Vienna, starting to practice it in 1933. It would become widely used on individuals with schizophrenia and other mental patients. He noted that insulin-induced coma and convulsions, due to the low level of glucose attained in the blood (hypoglycemic crisis), had a short-term appearance of changing the mental state of drug addicts and psychotics, sometimes dramatically so. He reported that up to 88% of his patients improved with insulin shock therapy, but most other people reported more mixed results and it was eventually shown that patient selection had been biased and that it didn't really have any specific benefits and had many risks, adverse effects and fatalities. However, his method became widely applied for many years in mental institutions worldwide. In the USA and other countries it was gradually dropped after the introduction of the electroconvulsive therapy in the 1940s and the first neuroleptics in the 1950s.

Dr. Sakel died from a heart attack<ref>[https://web.archive.org/web/20071121081704/http://www.time.com/time/magazine/article/0,9171,893830,00.html Time - Milestones, December 16, 1957]</ref> on December 2, 1957, in New York City, NY, USA.

Footnotes

Further reading

Fink, M (1984), "Meduna and the Origins of Convulsive Therapy", American Journal of Psychiatry, 141(9): 1034-1041 (This historical and biographical paper discusses the introduction of the shock treatment in psychiatry, the role of a theory of the biological antagonism between epilepsy and schizophrenia, and the contributions of Ladislas J. Meduna, Sakel, Ugo Cerletti, and Lucio Bini.)
Doroshow, DB: Performing a Cure for Schizophrenia: Insulin Coma Therapy on the Wards. Journal of the History of Medicine and Allied Sciences'', Advance Access published online on November 14, 2006
 Jones, K. Insulin coma therapy in schizophrenia. J. Royal Soc. Med, 93: 147-149, 2000.

External links
 The History of Shock Therapy in Psychiatry
 TIME Magazine article about Dr Sakel written in 1937

1900 births
1957 deaths
Jews from Galicia (Eastern Europe)
Ukrainian Jews
Polish psychiatrists
American neuroscientists
American people of Austrian-Jewish descent
Neurophysiologists
20th-century Austrian physicians
People from Nadvirna